Sappho  was launched in France circa 1803, probably under another name, and captured in 1804. She became a West Indiaman and then privateer that the French Navy recaptured and destroyed in March 1808.

Sappho first appeared in Lloyd's Register (LR) in the supplementary pages to the 1805 issue. She first appeared in the Register of Shipping (RS) in 1806. (There is no 1805 volume available online.) 

Sappho, Bell, master, made several voyages to Jamaica and return between 1805 and 1807.

The extent of her armament and the size of her crew  suggest that she was a privateer.

In February 1808 Lloyd's List reported that the privateer Sappho had detained and sent into Cowes Mary, Babbidge, master, which had been on a voyage from Virginia to Amsterdam.

Capture: Prior to 10 March 1808 the French frigates  and  captured Sappho whilst she was sailing from London to Madeira, Portugal. They set fire to her and sank her. The frigates were returning to France from Martinique. They also captured and destroyed two other British merchant vessels, Sarah King and Windham. The French put the crews on Sofia, Delaney, master, of and for New York, which brought them into Plymouth on 26 March. Sofia had been coming from Belfast.

Notes

Citations

1800s ships
Ships built in France
Captured ships
Age of Sail merchant ships of England
Privateer ships of the United Kingdom